Jean Kina (fl. 1790–1804), was a slave in the French colony of Saint Domingue who became a counterrevolutionary military leader in the Haitian Revolution and French Revolutionary Wars. 

His career began with the leadership of a slave militia formed by white planters in the Grand'Anse region, initially to combat uprisings by the local gens de couleur. Kina eventually rose to become a colonel in the British Army, which invaded Saint Domingue in 1793. Kina became highly regarded by his British superiors as a practitioner of the irregular style of warfare common in the mountainous and densely forested interior of the colony. 

After the evacuation of British forces from Saint Domingue, Kina visited London, where he met with officials in Whitehall and with French émigré planters. Pierre Victor Malouet attempted to enlist Kina in an abortive scheme to kidnap the adolescent sons of Toussaint Louverture from a military boarding school in France. He subsequently served in the British-occupied French colony of Martinique. In Martinique he married Félicité-Adelaïde Quimard, a local girl of free colored descent. In December 1800 he led a brief bloodless uprising against the local government on behalf of the rights of free people of color, who were incensed by efforts of the civil government to more strictly enforce laws against the unauthorized manumission of slaves. On the night of December 5, 1800, Kina gathered around thirty armed men, most of them free colored members of Martinique's militia, and marched from Fort-Royal (now Fort-de-France) toward a natural strongpoint in the surrounding hills. The group stopped at plantations and settlements along the way to recruit more men and protest the abuses suffered by free people of color and slaves by the local white population. Kina and his men demanded the imposition of British law on Martinique, which they argued would protect them from these abuses; they carried a British Union flag with an attached banner inscribed with the phrase "La Loi Brittanique." The following morning Kina's band met with a detachment of British troops and local militia under the command of Colonel Frederick Maitland. Maitland, sympathetic to Kina's grievances and fearing the consequences of a violent confrontation, offered amnesty to the rebels in exchange for them laying down their arms.  

After surrendering to British troops, Kina was not judicially punished for the rebellion but was deported to London and incarcerated in Newgate Prison under the terms of the Aliens Act 1793. He was released and traveled to France after the Peace of Amiens. He was incarcerated again alongside his son Zamor in the Fort de Joux, where Toussaint Louverture was also imprisoned at the time. He was released in August 1804, when he and his son joined the Armee d'Italie as carpenters.

References

Haitian rebel slaves
Military leaders of the French Revolutionary Wars
People of the Haitian Revolution